Anna Sueangam-iam (born 10 November 1998) is a Thai with German decent actress and beauty pageant titleholder who was crowned Miss Universe Thailand 2022. She represented Thailand at the 71st Miss Universe competition.

Early life and education 
Sueangam-iam was born on 10 November 1998 in Bangkok, Thailand. As a child, Her mother and father worked as garbage collectors for the Bangkok Metropolitan Administration in Bangkok. Due to the hardwork of her parents, she stayed with her great-grandmother who was a buddhist nun until she graduated from college. Sueangam-iam graduated, with first-class honour (gold medal) from the faculty of liberal arts and science, Kasetsart University. She has one-fourth of German ancestry, making her the sixth consecutive Miss Universe Thailand titleholder of the past 7 years to be of Eurasian descent.

Pageantry

Miss Thailand 2020 

Sueangam-iam had previously participated in the Miss Thailand 2020 pageant at the Chiang Mai International Convention and Exhibition Center in Chiang Mai, where she was able to enter the Top 16.

Miss Universe Thailand 2022 

Sueangam-iam participated at the Miss Universe Thailand 2022 competition. On July 30, 2022, she was crowned as Miss Universe Thailand 2022 succeeding Anchilee Scott-Kemmis, who was Miss Universe Thailand 2021, at the end of the event.

Miss Universe 2022 

Sueangam-iam represented Thailand at the 71st edition of the Miss Universe competition, but was unplaced.

References 

1998 births
Living people
Anna Sueangam-iam
Anna Sueangam-iam
Miss Universe 2022 contestants
Anna Sueangam-iam
Anna Sueangam-iam
Anna Sueangam-iam